George White (c. 1684–1732) was an English mezzotint engraver.

Life
The son of Robert White, he was born about 1684, and instructed by his father until his death in 1703. He completed some of the plates left unfinished by the latter, and himself executed a few in the line manner; but beginning from 1712 he turned to mezzotints. A portrait of Jean-Baptiste Monnoyer, which he executed in this style from a painting by Godfrey Kneller, was much admired and brought him work. He died at his house in Bloomsbury on 27 May 1732.

Works

A leading English mezzotint engraver, he was the first to make use of etched lines to strengthen the work. White's plates number about sixty, the most of them he published himself, and include portraits of William Dobson, bishop George Hooper, Tycho Wing, and Old Parr. White, like his father, drew portraits in pencil on vellum; he also practised in crayons, and latterly took to painting in oils. His plate of the Laughing Boy after Frans Hals was published after his death, with laudatory verses.

Selected works
National Portrait Gallery
 Probably William Somerville, pencil on vellum, 1709
 Isaac Watts, mezzotint, 1727
 William Dobson, mezzotint, ( 1642–1646)
 John Dryden, mezzotint, (1698)
 Thomas Parr, mezzotint, early 18th century
 Erasmus Smith, mezzotint, early 18th century
 Thomas Blood, mezzotint, early 18th century
  James Gardiner, line engraving, early 18th century
 Thomas Reynolds, mezzotint, early 18th century
National Gallery of Victoria, Melbourne
 Rev. Mr John Nesbitt
 Nicolas Sanderson

References

Attribution

1680s births
1732 deaths
English engravers